Abyek (also Romanized as Ābyek, Abiak, and Abiyek; also known as Abiak Sarāi) is a city and capital of Abyek County, Qazvin Province, Iran. At the 2006 census its population was 47,233, in 11,989 families.

Abyek lies roughly halfway between Qazvin to the northwest and Karaj to the southeast. It has a major cement factory, which is responsible for air pollution in the area.

Most of the inhabitants of the city are Azerbaijanis, however, minorities of Tat and Romanlu people also live in this city.

References

External links

Abyek County
Cities in Qazvin Province